Frankie Carroll (born 1970 in Garryspillane, County Limerick) is a retired Irish sportsperson.  He played hurling with his local club Garryspillane and was a member of the Limerick senior inter-county team in the 1990s and 2000s.

References

1971 births
Living people
Garryspillane hurlers
Limerick inter-county hurlers
Munster inter-provincial hurlers